Kleinneuhausen is a municipality in the Sömmerda district of Thuringia, Germany.

Town partnerships
Kleinneuhausen fosters partnerships with the following places:
 Hettenrodt, Birkenfeld, Rhineland-Palatinate.

References

Sömmerda (district)
Grand Duchy of Saxe-Weimar-Eisenach